Coronet Theatre may refer to:
Coronet Theatre (Los Angeles), a former theatre which closed in 2008
Eugene O'Neill Theatre, New York, formerly called the Coronet Theatre
The Coronet, Elephant and Castle, London, also called the Coronet Theatre
Coronet Cinema, Notting Hill, London, formerly the Coronet Theatre
Coronet Theatre, London, formerly The Print Room, is an Off West End theatre located in the former Coronet Cinema in London